Dipleura is a genus of trilobites in the order Phacopida. It was described by Green in 1832, and the type species is Dipleura dekayi. The type locality was in the Hamilton Group in New York.

These fast-moving low-level epifaunal carnivores lived during the middle Devonian and Ordovician periods from 460.9 to 383.7 Ma.

Distribution 
Fossils of this genus have been found in the Devonian of France, Libya and United States, as well as in the Ordovician of United States. Also in the Emsian-Givetian Floresta Formation of the Altiplano Cundiboyacense, Colombia, fossils of Dipleura have been found.

References

Bibliography 
 

Homalonotidae
Phacopida genera
Devonian trilobites
Silurian trilobites
Ordovician trilobites
Devonian animals of Africa
Devonian trilobites of Europe
Fossils of France
Trilobites of North America
Ordovician United States
Devonian United States
Fossils of Georgia (U.S. state)
Devonian trilobites of South America
Devonian Colombia
Fossils of Colombia
Darriwilian first appearances
Middle Devonian genus extinctions
Fossil taxa described in 1832
Floresta Formation